The 2010 K League Championship was the 14th competition of the K League Championship, and was held to decide the 28th champions of the K League. The top six clubs of the regular season qualified for the championship. The winners of the regular season directly qualified for the final, and second place team qualified for the semi-final. The other four clubs entered the first round, and the winners of the second round advanced to the semi-final. Each match was played as a single match, excluding the final which consisted of two matches.

Qualified teams

Bracket

First round

Jeonbuk vs Gyeongnam

Ulsan vs Seongnam

Second round

Semi-final

Final

First leg

Second leg

FC Seoul won 4–3 on aggregate.

Final table

See also
 2010 in South Korean football
 2010 K League

External links
Official website 
 Review at K League 

K League Championship
K League
K League